The EthioTrees Ecosystem Restoration Association, in short EthioTrees, established in 2016, is a project for environmental rehabilitation and woodland restoration in Dogu’a Tembien (Ethiopia).

Context
Since many years, there has been severe land degradation and desertification in Tigray and the area became also impoverished; however, a lot of efforts are done to rehabilitate these semi-arid mountain landscapes. Since 1994, researchers, students, and field assistants have studied the environment of Dogu’a Tembien. To contribute to the ongoing effort for rehabilitation, they initiated development projects that addressed in the first place land conservation, ecosystem services, and livelihood. EthioTrees is one of these projects.

Objectives
EthioTrees has as objectives: 
 to enhance community-driven woodland restoration in exclosures
 to sequester carbon in exclosures, both as above-ground biomass and soil organic matter
 to develop and valorise ecosystem services, including:
 * ground water availability
 * honey production
 * incense (oil) production

Associations of landless farmers
EthioTrees not only improves soil organic carbon, biomass, groundwater recharge, or biodiversity but also cash income for landless farmers. Most farmers estimate that lack of access to water is the main problem for their livelihood. In addition, landless youngsters derive much less income from sales of livestock or agricultural produce, in comparison to farmers with land.  The communities are invited to design and implement the project themselves; for this purpose, EthioTrees uses a participatory mapping approach during all phases of the project.

EthioTrees’ exclosures
The EthioTrees project manages these exclosures:
 Addi Lihtsi, near the village of Addi Lihtsi (412 ha)
 Addi Meles, near the village of Migichi (65 ha)
 Addilal, near the village of Addilal (144.81 ha)
 Afedena, near the village of Afedena (70 ha)
 Ch'elaqo, near the village of Ch'elaqo (50 ha)
 Gemgema, near the village of Tsigaba (92 ha)
 Kidmi Gestet, near the village of Gestet (46 ha)
 Lafa, near the village of Lafa in Mizane Birhan municipality (45.25 ha)
 May Be'ati, near the village of May Be'ati (46 ha)
 Mi'am Atali, near the village of Mi'am Atali (83 ha)
 May Genet, near the village of May Genet (60 ha)
 May Hib'o, near the village of Addi Lihtsi (50 ha)
 Sesemat, near the village of Tahtay Sesemat (46 ha)
 Togogwa, near the village of Togogwa (196 ha)
 Tukhul, near the village of Tukhul, in Addi Azmera municipality (36 ha)
 Ziban Dake, near the village of Didiben (300 ha)
 Gojam Sfra, near the village of Migichi (275 ha)
 Katina Ruba, near the village of Didiben (48 ha)

Ecosystem restoration and valorisation
EthioTrees manages 18 exclosures with a total area of 1174 hectares in 2017 and 1596 ha in 2018. The older the exclosures, the higher is the total carbon content in vegetation and soil. EthioTrees has calculated that they manage to sequester 9.2 tonnes CO2 per year per hectare.

Carbon offset
The sequestered carbon is certified using the Plan Vivo voluntary carbon standard, after which carbon credits are sold, among others to Davines, an Italian producer of beauty products. This company at the same time wishes to create a virtuous impact on people and the environment. The revenues are then reinvested in the villages, according to the priorities of the communities; it may be for an additional class in the village school, a water pond, conservation in the exclosures, or a store for incense.

Partners
Main partners of Ethiotrees are
 Dogu’a Tembien District Administration (Ethiopia)
 Municipal administrations (Ethiopia)
 Incense producing cooperatives (Ethiopia)
 Plan Vivo (U.K.)
 Mekelle University (Ethiopia)
 VLIR-UOS (Belgium)
 Davines (Italy)
 Ghent University (Belgium)
 Province East Flanders (Belgium)
 King Baudouin Foundation (Belgium)
 Bos Plus (Belgium)
 Province West Flanders (Belgium)
 Ñangareko Consultores (Bolivia)
 Association Tesfay (Liége, Belgium)

References

External links
 EthioTrees on Davines website
 EthioTrees project website
 EthioTrees on Plan Vivo website
 Link For Forestry Projects

Land management
Environmental conservation
Greenhouse gas emissions
Emissions reduction
Carbon finance
2016 establishments in Ethiopia
Tigray Region
Dogu'a Tembien
Nature conservation in Ethiopia
Exclosures of Tigray Region